Suite for Flute and Jazz Piano (aka Suite for Flute and Jazz Piano Trio) is a "crossover" composition by the jazz pianist and composer Claude Bolling. The composition, originally written in 1973, is a suite of seven movements, written for a classical flute, and a jazz piano trio (piano, string bass, and drums).

Album
The suite was recorded in 1975 by Bolling, classical flautist Jean-Pierre Rampal, bassist Max Hédiguer, and drummer Marcel Sabiani, and originally released as an LP album by CBS Masterworks Records and Columbia Masterworks.

Legacy
In the U.S., the album was nominated in 1975 for a Grammy Award for Best Chamber Music Performance.  A video recording of Bolling and Rampal playing the Suite was recorded in 1976 at the Palace of Versailles in France, and was released on LaserVision video disc and on videotape.  Eventually, under the title, Suite for Flute and Jazz Piano Trio, digital CD and DVD versions of the respective audio and video recordings were also released.   In 1986, Bolling and Rampal released Bolling's later composition, Suite for Flute and Jazz Piano Trio No. 2.

Other recordings
2003: Roseli Quartet (Naxos Records)
2011: Laurel Zucker (Cantilena Records)
2012: Jasmine Choi (Sony Classical)

Track listing
LP side A:
"Baroque and Blue" – 5:18
"Sentimentale" – 7:45
"Javanaise" – 5:15
LP side B:
"Fugace" – 3:50
"Irlandaise" – 2:59
"Versatile" – 5:07
"Véloce" – 3:40
all compositions by Bolling

Personnel
Jean-Pierre Rampal — flute, bass flute on "Versatile"
Claude Bolling — piano
Max Hédiguer — bass
Marcel Sabiani — drums

Further reading
Columbia Masterworks M 33233
Suite for Flute and Jazz Piano Trio at [ allmusic.com]

References

Claude Bolling albums
1975 albums
Suites (music)
Columbia Records albums
Jazz albums
1973 compositions
1970s classical albums